A Golden Arrow Award was an accolade presented by the members of the Japan Magazine Publishers Association (JMPA) to recognize excellence in domestic media, such as in film, television, and music.

The 1st Golden Arrow Awards were held on March 17, 1964. The 45th and last Golden Arrow Awards were presented on March 3, 2008.

Award categories
 Film Award
 Play Award
 Music Award
 Broadcast Award – Drama
 Broadcast Award – Variety
 Sports Award
 Newcomer Award
 Popularity Award
 Merit Award
 Magazine Award
 Special Award

See also

 List of Asian television awards

References

External links
 Japan Magazine Publishers Association
 Complete Downloadable List of Golden Arrow Winners

Awards established in 1964
Japanese film awards
Japanese music awards
Japanese television awards
1964 establishments in Japan
Awards disestablished in 2008
2008 disestablishments in Japan